Fabio Orsini (1476 - 29 December 1503) was an Italian condottiero and lord of Mentana. He was son of Paolo Orsini, who was murdered in 1503 by Cesare Borgia.

Cesare Borgia apprehended Vitellozzo Vitelli and Paolo Orsini, so Fabio fled when he saw the arrest of them. On 23 August Ludovico of Pitigliano and Fabio Orsini came with 400 horse and 500 foot soldiers. The alliance between the Borgia and the Colonna saved Caesar from, and on 24 August Ludovico was yielded and Fabio dismayed.

At nineteen, he became a mercenary and brave and ruthless warrior, fighting many battles and dying of a head wound on 29 December
1503 during the battle of Garigliano.

References

Bibliography
 

1476 births
1504 deaths
15th-century condottieri
Orsini family
16th-century condottieri
Military personnel from Rome